Westobou may refer to:

 Westobou River, the former name of the Savannah River that was derived from the Westo (also known as Westoe) Native American Indians. 
 Westobou Studio, a limited liability company that was founded in 2003 in Augusta, Georgia